Jordan Run Falls is a waterfall on Jordan Run, a tributary of the North Fork South Branch Potomac River in Grant County, West Virginia, United States.

Visiting 
This waterfall is on private property.  It can be accessed with permission from the owner.  For owner contact information visit McGuinness Self Service at 4729 Jordan Run Rd, Maysville, WV 26833 (+13047497440).  Lady at register seemed like it would be no problem, but that permission was required to be on the property to access.

Geography
Jordan Run Falls is situated in Jordan Run Gorge, a small canyon opening just northwest of the Smoke Hole Caverns visitors parking lot. It may be accessed by a somewhat arduous hike up the trail-less stream bed.

Kayaking
Jordan Run is considered a Class 5 stream and the falls is considered one of the biggest runnable waterfalls in West Virginia. Portaging around the falls can be accomplished high on river right. Wood obstacles are present in the water. Below the falls the run is considered Class 3.

See also
List of waterfalls in West Virginia
Jordan Run, West Virginia

References

External links
Jordan Run on Americanwhitewater.org

Waterfalls of West Virginia
Landforms of Grant County, West Virginia
Tourist attractions in Grant County, West Virginia